Sarah Brown Ingersoll Cooper (December 12, 1835 – December 11, 1896) was an American educator, author, evangelist, philanthropist, and civic
activist. She is remember as a religious teacher and her efforts to increase the wide interest in kindergarten work. Cooper served as first president of the International Kindergarten Union, president of the National Kindergarten Union, president and vice-president of the Woman's Press Association, president of the Woman's Suffrage Association, and president of the Woman's Christian Temperance Union. She served as vice-president of the Century Club, treasurer of the World's Federation of Woman's Clubs, a director of the Associated Charities, and one of the five women elected to the Pan-Republican Congress. At the 1893 World's Fair, she delivered thirty-six addresses, and on her return, helped to organize the Woman's Congress of which she was president for two years and at the time of her death. Several years before her death, Mrs. Cooper became a convert to equal suffrage and was president of the Amendment Campaign Committee. A few months before she died, Cooper stated that she was an officer of nineteen societies for charitable purposes.

She dealt with a voluminous correspondence. The assertion was made that the letters which she answered in the year before she died numbered 11,000. She wrote extensively on topics related to women, children, and education.

Early life and education
Sarah Brown Ingersoll was born in Cazenovia, New York, December 12, 1835. She had two younger sisters who became Mrs. J. A. Skilton and Mrs. Reese M. Rawlings. Her mother died when she was a little child, and she was adopted by her great-aunt, over 70 years of age. Col. Robert G. Ingersoll was a cousin.

When twelve years old, she appeared in print in the village paper, the Madison County Whig, and from that time, she was more or less engaged in literary work on papers and magazines. When but fourteen years of age, she opened a Sunday-school class in Eagle Village,  from Cazenovia, and that class was the start of what became a church congregation. When she started the school, some of the committeemen came to her and told her that, while they believed her to be qualified in every way to teach, at the same time they would all like it better if she would go home and lengthen her skirts. 

She was graduated from the Cazenovia Seminary in 1853, the first coeducational institution in the U.S., and numbering among its graduates Leland Stanford, Phillip Armour, and Charles Dudley Warner—all lifelong friends of Mrs. Cooper. She subsequently attended the Troy Female Seminary, of which Frances Willard was principal, studying music and modern languages.

Career
After her graduation from college, she went to Augusta, Georgia, as a governess in the family of Governor William Schley. On the Governor's plantation, there were 500 or more slaves, and Cooper (then Miss Ingersoll), used to gather them about her to teach them the Scriptures.

While in Augusta, in 1855, she married Halsey Fenimore Cooper, also a Cazenovia Seminary graduate, who had been appointed by President Franklin Pierce to the office of surveyor and inspector of the port of  Chattanooga, Tennessee. They also worked as editors on The Advertiser, with Mrs. Cooper assisting Mr. Cooper. They had two daughters, Harriet ("Hattie") (b. 1856) and Mollie (b. 1861), as well as two sons, who died while still babies.

Being abolitionists, the Coopers went north at the start of the Civil War.  They settled briefly in Washington, D.C., then moved to Memphis, Tennessee in 1863, where Mr. Cooper was appointed assessor of internal revenue. There, Mrs. Cooper was elected president of the Society for the Aid of Refugees. She taught a large Bible class, which comprised from 100 to 300 soldiers. In 1864, after Mollie died, Mrs. Cooper began to suffer from depression and illness. For two years, she attempted to recuperate in Saint Paul, Minnesota. She recovered when the family moved to San Francisco, California in 1869, where Mr. Cooper worked for the IRS. She became a staff member of the Overland Monthly, workinging as a proof-reader, essayist, and book reviewer. She also penned articles for the religious press, and researched and wrote field reports regarding education in California for the U.S. government in Washington, D.C.

Her first Bible class in San Francisco was in the Howard Presbyterian Church, where Dr. Scudder was filling the pulpit. From there, she went to the Calvary Presbyterian Church. It was there that Mrs. Cooper was tried for heresy, because she could not conscientiously subscribe to the doctrines of infant damnation or everlasting punishment. Mrs. Cooper was welcomed to the First Congregational Church, where she afterward remained.

Still later, opened the class in the First Congregational Church. That class numbered over 300 members and embraced persons representing many religious sects, including the Jewish and the Roman Catholic faiths. While the credit of establishing the first free kindergarten in San Francisco is due to Prof. Felix Adler and a few of his friends, yet the credit of the extraordinary growth of the work is almost entirely due to Mrs. Cooper, who paid a visit to the Silver street free kindergarten in November, 1878, and from that moment became the leader of the kindergarten work and the friend of the training school for kindergarten teachers.

The rapid growth of the free kindergarten system in California had its first impulse in six articles written by Mrs. Cooper for the San Francisco Bulletin in 1879. The first of these was entitled "The Kindergarten, a Remedy for Hoodlumism," and was of vital interest to the public, for just at that time, ruffianism was so terrific, that a vigilance committee was organized to protect the citizens. The second article was "The History of the Silver Street Free Kindergarten." That aroused immediate interest among philanthropic people. In the early part of 1878, there was not a free Kindergarten on the western side of the Rocky Mountains; by 1892, there were 65 in San Francisco, and several others in progress of organization. Outside of San Francisco, they extended from the extreme northern part of Washington to Southern California and New Mexico, and they formed in Oregon, Nevada, and Colorado, and in almost every large city and town in California. Mrs. Cooper attributed the rapid strides in that work in San Francisco to the fact that wealthy persons, induced to study the work for themselves, became convinced of its permanent and essential value to the State. The second free kindergarten in San Francisco was opened under the auspices of Cooper's Bible class, in October, 1879. She founded the "Jackson Street Kindergarten Association" in 1879.

In 1882, Mrs. Leland Stanford, who had been an active helper in the work from the very first, dedicated a large sum for the establishment of free kindergartens, in San Francisco and in adjacent towns, in memory of her son. Then other memorial kindergartens were endowed. By 1892, 32 kindergartens were under the care of Mrs. Cooper and her daughter, Harriet. Over  was donated to Mrs. Cooper to carry on this work in San Francisco, and over 10,000 children were trained in these schools. Her notable and historical trial for heresy in 1881 made her famous as a religious teacher and did much to increase the wide interest in her kindergarten work. Mrs. Cooper is a philanthropist and devotes all her time to benevolent work.

Cooper served as a director of the Associated Charities, vice-president of the Pacific Coast Women's Press Association, member of the Century Club and the leader of one of the largest Bible classes in the United States. Considered to be one of the best-known and best-loved women on the Pacific coast, she was elected a member of the Pan-Republic Kindergarten Congress of 1893, one of five women of the world who had that distinguished honor, along with Mary Simmerson Cunningham Logan, Mary Virginia Ellet Cabell, president of the Daughters of the American Revolution, Frances Willard, and Clara Barton, of the American Red Cross. She was also a speaker while at the World's Columbian Exposition (Chicago, 1893).

She was elected treasurer of the World's Federation of Women's Clubs in 1894. In 1895, she served as president of the National Kindergarten Union. She was the first president of the International Kindergarten Union.

Personal life
In 1879, Halsey lost his job as Deputy Surveyor and the family suffered financial difficulties. As a result of the strain, he committed suicide in 1885. After attempting to clear her husband's name, Sarah continued her philanthropic career. She taught both the Bible School and Kindergarten, and was involved with women's rights groups. Her daughter, Harriet had quit her teaching job to assist Sarah, but suffered from bouts of depression, especially following the death of her father. Harriet asphyxiated her mother and herself on December 11, 1896, by turning on the gas, with suicidal intent, after her mother had fallen asleep.

Notes

References

Attribution

Bibliography

External links
 
 "A Pacific Heretic", Cooper's trial (Unity, vol. 7–8, pp. 349–50)

1835 births
1896 deaths
Philanthropists from New York (state)
American suffragists
Cazenovia College alumni
Deaths from asphyxiation
Emma Willard School alumni
Activists from Syracuse, New York
People from Cazenovia, New York
19th-century American philanthropists
Wikipedia articles incorporating text from A Woman of the Century
Early childhood education in the United States
Clubwomen
American letter writers
Founders of schools in the United States
Women founders
Educators from California
19th-century American women educators
19th-century American educators
19th-century American women writers
Heresy in Christianity
American essayists
Woman's Christian Temperance Union people
Pacific Coast Women's Press Association